The  is a river in Hiroshima Prefecture and Yamaguchi Prefecture, Japan. The river forms part of the border between the two prefectures, which used to be the border between former Suō Province and Aki Province.

See also 
 Ozegawa Dam
 Yasaka Dam

References

Rivers of Hiroshima Prefecture
Rivers of Yamaguchi Prefecture
Rivers of Japan